"Arigatou" is FLOW's fourteenth single. It reached #25 on the Oricon charts in its first week and charted for 7 weeks. *

Track listing

References

Flow (band) songs
2008 singles
2008 songs
Ki/oon Music singles
Song articles with missing songwriters